The 1970 World Amateur Snooker Championship was the fourth edition of the championship that later became known as the IBSF World Snooker Championship, the first event having been held in 1963. The 1970 tournament was played at the Meadowbank Stadium, Edinburgh, Scotland from 19 October to 7 November 1970, with two round-robin groups each producing one player to contest the final. Both finalists were from England. Jonathan Barron defeated Sid Hood 11–7 to win the title.

Jack Rogers made the highest  of the tournament, 65.

Qualifying groups
The final tables are shown below.

Final
Scores in bold indicate winning  scores.

References

Snooker amateur tournaments
International sports competitions hosted by Scotland
1970 in snooker
Sports competitions in Edinburgh
1970 in Scottish sport
1970s in Edinburgh